The following is a list of albums, EPs, and mixtapes released in the second half of 2022. These albums are (1) original, i.e. excluding reissues, remasters, and compilations of previously released recordings, and (2) notable, defined as having received significant coverage from reliable sources independent of the subject.

For additional information about bands formed, reformed, disbanded, or on hiatus, for deaths of musicians, and for links to musical awards, see 2022 in music.

For information on albums released in the first half of 2022, see List of 2022 albums (January–June).

Third quarter

July

August

September

Fourth quarter

October

November

December

References

 
Albums
2022 (July-December)